Togo Dam  is a rockfill dam located in Hokkaido Prefecture in Japan. The dam is used for irrigation. The catchment area of the dam is 35.8 km2. The dam impounds about 12  ha of land when full and can store 510 thousand cubic meters of water. The construction of the dam was completed in 1969 .

References

Dams in Hokkaido